L is the second album by Godley & Creme. It was released in 1978. At 34 minutes, it is less than a third as long as the group's previous effort, the ill-received triple concept album Consequences (1977). Despite this, L was also not received well commercially.

The songs contain much variation and artistry, dissonances, complex time signatures and melodies, poetic lyrics, and some echoes from Frank Zappa's Over-Nite Sensation (1973).  Zappa is even name-checked on the song "Art School Canteen." The album was played almost completely by Godley and Creme, except for saxophones, and a brief vocal cameo by Paul Gambaccini.

The lyrics retained the satirical stance of some 10cc material, with songs such as "The Sporting Life" and "Art School Canteen", which deal with suicide and art school angst.

The album cover depicts an "L-plate", used in some countries to designate vehicles with novice drivers ("Learner"). Although the duo were generally known as 'Godley and Creme', the original cover merely repeats their surnames around its perimeter (on the back) and delineates their 'group' name as 'Godley + Creme' on the spine.

Track listing 
Side 1
 "The Sporting Life" – 7:25
 "Sandwiches of You" – 3:17
 "Art School Canteen" – 3:00
 "Group Life" – 4:11
Side 2
 "Punchbag" – 4:44
 "Foreign Accents" – 4:37
 "Hit Factory/Business Is Business" – 7:08

Personnel 

 Kevin Godley –  vocals, drums, xylophone, roto-toms, percussion, congas, triangle, Clavinet, high-hat, tonal percussion, snare drum, bongos, bass guitar on 'Group Life' 
 Lol Creme – vocals, piano, Rhodes electric piano, guitars, Kramer bass guitar, Gizmo, Farfisa organ, Guild 12-string acoustic, Guild acoustic bass guitar, Clavinet, drums 
 Andy Mackay – baritone, tenor, soprano and alto saxophone
 Paul Gambaccini – Bad Samaritan voices on "The Sporting Life"
 Jonathan Handelsman – alto and soprano saxophone on "Group Life"
 Chris Gray, Nigel Gray – engineers

References 

1978 albums
Godley & Creme albums
Mercury Records albums